Parmena unifasciata is a species of beetle in the family Cerambycidae. It was described by Rossi in 1790, originally under the genus Lamia. It has a fairly wide distribution throughout Europe.

References

Parmenini
Beetles described in 1790